Denise Biellmann (born 11 December 1962) is a Swiss professional figure skater. She was the European and World Champion in 1981 and won the Swiss Championships three times.

Career

Amateur career
Born in Zurich, Biellmann won her first international championship in Belgium at age 8; and, at age 11, she won the Swiss Junior Figure Skating Championships. At age 14, she competed at the 1977 European Championships and placed second in the Free Skate portion of the competition.

At the age of 15, she was the first female skater to land the triple lutz in competition, which she performed for the first time at the 1978 European Championships. At the same event, she became the first woman to receive a 6.0 in Technical Merit, receiving the score from British judge Pauline Borrajo. She was 12th in Figures, first in the Free Skate, and finished fourth overall.

At the 1980 Winter Olympics in Lake Placid, Biellmann  again performed poorly in compulsory figures and was in twelfth place. She was second in the short program and won the free skate to finish fourth overall.

The Biellmann spin was named after her; she popularized and perfected the spin, but did not invent it. It was present in skating at least since the 1965 European Championships when Tamara Moskvina performed it. It remains the only figure skating spin to be officially named after a person in ISU regulations.

Biellmann retired from amateur competition at age 18, shortly after her win at the 1981 World Championships.

Professional career 

Biellmann remains involved in the international figure skating community as a participant in both professional shows and competitions.

She participated in Pro7 Season 1, partnered with television presenter Pierre Geisensetter, and in Season 2, partnered with actor Patrick Bach.

She participated in the Eurovision Dance Contest 2007 representing Switzerland with partner Sven Ninnemann.

She won the prestigious Challenge of Champions, regarded as the most important professional event, a record 5 times.  Along with all her other titles making her perhaps the most successful professional skater ever.

In 2014 Biellmann was inducted into the World Figure Skating Hall of Fame.

Competitive highlights

Book 
 Denise Biellmann – Die Biografie. Cameo, Bern 2022, ISBN 978-3-03951-011-5.

References

External links

 
 
 
 YouTube video - 1980 Winter Olympics

1962 births
Living people
Figure skaters from Zürich
Olympic figure skaters of Switzerland
Figure skaters at the 1980 Winter Olympics
Swiss female single skaters
World Figure Skating Championships medalists
European Figure Skating Championships medalists